Lupu Pick (2 January 1886 – 7 March 1931) was a German actor, film director, producer, and screenwriter of the silent era. He appeared in 50 films between 1910 and 1928.

Born in Romania, Pick's father was a Jewish Austrian, his mother, of Romanian origin. He began as a stage actor in Hamburg, Flensburg and Berlin before 1910. In 1917 he founded the film company Rex-Film AG.

He served on the board of the Film Association of Industrialists (Vorstand des Verbandes der Filmindustriellen), SPIO and the Film Directors Association of Germany (Verbandes der Filmregisseure Deutschlands) and worked intensively to establish the union-based umbrella organization of Filmmakers in Germany (Filmschaffenden Deutschlands) (Dacho). He was the organization's first chairman.

Pick was married to actress Edith Posca.

Selected filmography

 Die geheimnisvolle Villa (1914)
 No Sin on the Alpine Pastures (1915)
 A Night of Horror (1916)
 The Uncanny House (1916)
 Tales of Hoffmann (1916)
 Frank Hansen's Fortune (1917)
 The Lord of Hohenstein (1917)
 Mountain Air (1917)
 Let There Be Light (1917)
 The Picture of Dorian Gray (1917)
 The Mirror of the World (1918)
 The Serenyi (1918)
 The Forbidden Way (1920)
 Nobody Knows (1920)
 Shattered (1921)
 Nights of Terror (1921)
 To the Ladies' Paradise (1922)
 City in View (1923)
 New Year's Eve (1924)
 The Last Horse Carriage in Berlin (1926)
 The Armoured Vault (1926)
 Countess Ironing-Maid (1926)
 Grandstand for General Staff (1926)
 The House of Lies (1926)
 The Girl with the Five Zeros (1927)
 Family Gathering in the House of Prellstein (1927)
 Spies (1928)
 A Knight in London (1929)
 The Street Song (1931)

References

External links
 

1886 births
1931 deaths
20th-century Romanian male actors
German male silent film actors
Film people from Berlin
Romanian male film actors
Romanian male silent film actors
Romanian film directors
Romanian film producers
Romanian screenwriters
Romanian expatriates in Germany
German people of Austrian-Jewish descent
Film people from Iași
Male actors from Berlin
20th-century German male actors
Silent film screenwriters
20th-century screenwriters
Actors from Iași